SioSifa Taumoepeau (born 8 June 1961) is an athlete from Tonga.  He competes in archery.

Taumoepeau competed at the 2004 Summer Olympics in men's individual archery.  He was defeated in the first round of elimination, placing 61st overall.

References

External links
 

1961 births
Living people
Olympic archers of Tonga
Archers at the 2004 Summer Olympics
Tongan male archers